Gervasio Daniel Núñez (born 29 January 1988, in Formosa, Argentina) is an Argentine footballer who plays as a midfielder for Sarmiento.

Career
Born in Formosa, Núñez began his career at Academia Ernesto Duchini before moving to Rosario Central youth team. He progressed to make his first team debut on 9 March 2007 in a 2–0 away defeat to Independiente. He scored his first goal for the club on 29 October 2008 in a 3–0 home win against Gimnasia y Esgrima de Jujuy.

Núñez was part of the Rosario Central team that were relegated during the 2009-10 Argentine Primera División season. For the following season, Núñez joined recently promoted Primera División team Quilmes.

On 1 July 2011, Núñez signed a one-year loan deal with Polish Ekstraklasa champions Wisła Kraków.

In January 2017, Núñez joined Sarmiento in the Argentine Primera División.

Statistics
 (correct as of 8 May 2012)

References

External links
 

1988 births
Living people
People from Formosa, Argentina
Argentine footballers
Argentine expatriate footballers
Association football midfielders
Chilean Primera División players
Argentine Primera División players
Bolivian Primera División players
Primera Nacional players
Campeonato Brasileiro Série A players
Ekstraklasa players
Rangers de Talca footballers
Rosario Central footballers
Quilmes Atlético Club footballers
Wisła Kraków players
Botafogo de Futebol e Regatas players
Club Atlético Sarmiento footballers
Atlético Tucumán footballers
Central Córdoba de Santiago del Estero footballers
Club Atlético Belgrano footballers
Club Blooming players
Argentine expatriate sportspeople in Brazil
Argentine expatriate sportspeople in Chile
Argentine expatriate sportspeople in Poland
Argentine expatriate sportspeople in Bolivia
Expatriate footballers in Brazil
Expatriate footballers in Chile
Expatriate footballers in Poland
Expatriate footballers in Bolivia